Elbow Lake is a lake located in the Elbow Pass north of the Highwood pass in Kananaskis Country in Alberta, Canada.

See also
Elbow River
Lakes of Alberta

References

Kananaskis Improvement District
Lakes of Alberta